Pratapdighi is a village in Patashpur II CD block in Egra subdivision of Purba Medinipur district in the state of West Bengal, India.

Geography

Location

CD block HQ
The headquarters of Patashpur II CD block are located at Pratapdighi.

Urbanisation
96.96% of the population of Egra subdivision live in the rural areas. Only 3.04% of the population live in the urban areas, and that is the lowest proportion of urban population amongst the four subdivisions in Purba Medinipur district.

Note: The map alongside presents some of the notable locations in the subdivision. All places marked in the map are linked in the larger full screen map.

Demographics
As per 2011 Census of India Pratapdighi had a total population of 3,046 of which 1,560 (51%) were males and 1,486 (49%) were females. Population below 6 years was 363. The total number of literates in Pratapdighi was 2,329 (86.81% of the population over 6 years).

Transport
The Lalat-Janka Road passes through Pratapdighi.

Healthcare
There is a primary health centre at Pratapdighi (with 10 beds).

References

Villages in Purba Medinipur district